The   Monte Fantino is a mountain of the Ligurian Alps located in Piedmont (NW Italy).

Geography  

The mountain stands on the ridge dividing the small valleys of Rio Sbornina and Rio Sotto Crosa, both tributary of the Corsaglia. The ridge starts from Cima della Brignola, descends till to the Bocchino della Brignola (2.276 m), rises again up to Cima Ferlette and follows with the del Punta Lusco (2.277 m) and Monte Fantino, ending at the confluence between the two streams, close to the "Stalle Buroch" ("Buroch's stables"). Monte Fantino summit is marked by a cross; its prominence is 161 m. The east side of the mountain features steep and even grassy slopes, while its NW face overhangs rio Sbornina valley with a rocky wall of almost 500 metres drop. Administratively the mountain belongs to the comune of Frabosa Soprana.

SOIUSA classification 
According to the SOIUSA (International Standardized Mountain Subdivision of the Alps) the mountain can be classified in the following way:
 main part = Western Alps
 major sector = South Western Alps
 section = Ligurian Alps
 subsection = It:Alpi del Marguareis/Fr:Alpes Liguriennes Occidentales
 supergroup = It:Catena Marguareis-Mongioie/Fr:Chaîne Marguareis-Mongioie
 group = It:Gruppo Mongioie-Mondolè
 subgroup = It:Dorsale Cima Brignola-Mondolè
 code = I/A-1.II-B.4.b

Geology 
Monte Fantino stands in a karstic area. Around the mountain have been discovered some caves.

Access to the summit

Summer 
The summit of Monte Fantino can be reached with an hike starting from the saddle known as Sella Brignola (1.933 m), which can be accessed either from the Corsaglia valley (Ponte di Murao) or from the Rifugio della Balma. On the sw rocky wall have been traced some classic climbing routes.

Winter
The Monte Fantino can be reached in winter by some Ski mountaineering from different places; a well known itinerary starts from Prato Nevoso. Its difficulty rate is considered BS ('Skilled skiers).

Mountain huts
 Rifugio Balma, on the Maudagna/Corsaglia water divide.

References

 Bibliography 
 Sergio Marazzi, Atlante Orografico delle Alpi. SOIUSA''. Pavone Canavese (TO), Priuli & Verlucca editori, 2005.

Maps 
 
 
 

Mountains of the Ligurian Alps
Mountains of Piedmont
Two-thousanders of Italy